Emad El-Sayed   is an Egyptian footballer who plays for Egyptian Premier League side Al Ittihad as a goalkeeper.

Honours

Zamalek SC

Egypt Cup (1): 2008
 Saudi-Egyptian Super Cup: 2018
 CAF Confederation Cup : 2018–19

References

External links

Living people
Egyptian footballers
Zamalek SC players
Association football goalkeepers
1986 births